Malekabad-e Shandak (also Romanized as Malekābād-e Shandak; also known as Malekābād) is a village in Gowhar Kuh Rural District, Nukabad District, Khash County, Sistan and Baluchestan Province, Iran. At the 2006 census, its population was 226, in 59 families.

References 

Populated places in Khash County